No. 55 Operational Training Unit RAF was an Operational Training Unit of the Royal Air Force, formed in November 1940 at RAF Aston Down to train fighter pilots.

History
55 OTU RAF was an Operational Training Unit of the Royal Air Force, formed in November 1940 at RAF Aston Down to train fighter pilots, formed initially from No 5 OTU, flying Hawker Hurricanes. Supermarine Spitfires and Bristol Blenheims. From March 1941 the Unit was posted to RAF Usworth in Sunderland, flying Hurricanes. In July 1941 one pilot was lost flying a Hurricane from RAF Usworth in Sunderland. 

In April 1942 the unit was transferred to RAF Annan in Dumfrieshire, flying Miles Masters and Hawker Typhoons.  In December 1944 55 OTU was posted to RAF Aston Down, Gloucestershire.  At this time it was part of No. 12 Group RAF. The unit was equipped with over a hundred Hawker Typhoon aircraft, and acted as a ground attack training unit until it was disbanded in June 1945.

See also
List of Royal Air Force Operational Training Units

References

External Links
55OTU at rafcommands.com Retrieved 9 May 2022
55 OTU at rafweb.org Retrieved 9 May 2022
55 OTU at wartimememories.com Retrieved 9 May 2022

Operational training units of the Royal Air Force
Military units and formations established in 1940
Military units and formations disestablished in 1945